Anna King (4 April 1948 – 29 June 2003) was an author who had ten novels published between 1990 and 2003. Her first book, Life Is Just a Bowl of Cherries, was a semi-autobiographical work dealing with the central character Marie's lifelong struggle with Crohn's disease and its impact on herself and her family.

Following novels were usually set in the East End of London during the Victorian era, such as Ruby Chadwick, A Handful Of Sovereigns, Frankie's Manor, A Palace of Tears, Fur Coat No Knickers, The Ragamuffins, Luck Be a Lady and Maybe This Time.

She died of a stroke, aged fifty-five on 29 June 2003. She is survived by her husband and two children.

References

External links
 https://web.archive.org/web/20080705051120/http://www.littlebrown.co.uk/Authors/K/484
 https://www.amazon.co.uk/Life-Just-Bowl-Cherries-Anna/dp/0708926126

1948 births
2003 deaths
English women novelists
20th-century English novelists
20th-century English women writers